Fritz Kater (12 December 1861 – 20 May 1945) was a German trade unionist  active in the Free Association of German Trade Unions (FVdG) and its successor organization, the Free Workers' Union of Germany. He was the editor of the FVdG's organ Einigkeit and—after World War I—owner of the publishing houses Fritz Kater Verlag and Syndikalist.

The son of a farmhand, Kater was born in 1861 in Barleben. His mother died when he was two years old. From the age of five, he had to work on the farm or at home in order to support his family. During his final two years in school, he also worked in a local sugar factory during the winter. Even after Kater started an apprenticeship as a mason, he still had to help his father on the farm as the elderly man was frequently ill. Only during the winter did Kater have spare time to read and educate himself. Fritz Reuter, a humorous poet who wrote in Low German, was his favorite writer.

Kater joined the mason's trade union in Magdeburg in 1883 at a time when the Anti-Socialist Laws forbade most union activities. He came into contact with socialists from Berlin and Hamburg soon becoming a socialist himself under their influence. Kater soon began spending much of his spare time reading illegal socialist literature, and became active in the union's clandestine activities.

In 1887, Kater joined the Social Democratic Party of Germany (SPD). In the same year he also founded a masons' union in Barleben, becoming the organization's first chairman. His unionist activities, which included trying to organize workers from the sugar factory he had worked in his youth, attracted resentment from the local authorities, especially from the head of the district authority, an extremely conservative Junker. In 1889 he was sentenced to a two-month prison term for holding an illegal meeting and in the following year he served even more time in jail for giving a speech held to be seditious.

After the expiration of the Anti-Socialist Laws in 1890, Kater had close contacts with the opposition political movement Die Jungen, which was influenced by anarchist ideas. Kater was one of the founders of the Magdeburger Volksstimme, a social democratic newspaper started soon after the sunset of the Anti-Socialist Laws. The editors of the newspaper included several adherents of Die Jungen. At the 1891 Social Democratic Party (SPD) congress, Kater voted against the expelling Die Jungen movement from the party. Nevertheless, he remained in the party and did not join the new organization formed by Die Jungen, the Association of Independent Socialists.

In 1892, Kater moved to Berlin. There he worked as a mason, was elected a delegate for the city masons' union, and became an agitator. During the debates over the organisational structure of the union, he supported the "localist" concept as well as the creation of the Representatives Centralization of Germany in 1897 (which renamed itself the FVdG in 1903). He became the first chairman of the federation's Business Commission.

In 1907, after Kater refused a staff job with the centralized trade unions and declined to run as a delegate to the Reichstag delegate, he left the SPD. Though critical toward anarchism and syndicalism at first, Kater soon became a leading anarchosyndicalist figure in Germany. During a speech at the 1908 FVdG congress, Kater openly professed syndicalism for the first time. In 1913, he was a delegate at the First International Syndicalist Congress at Holborn Town Hall, London.

Fritz Kater was instrumental in sustaining the FVdG's structures during World War I and was one of the founders of the Free Workers' Union of Germany (FAUD) after the war. He worked for the FAUD as a speaker and author, representing the trade union at various congresses of the International Workers' Association. In 1930, he resigned as chairman of the FAUD because of his age.

On May 8, 1945, Kater attempted to defuse a dud bazooka shell. The shell exploded, causing burns to his face and chest. Kater died twelve days later in the hospital.

References

Fritz Kater in Magdeburger Biographisches Lexikon. Retrieved July 24, 2007.

1861 births
1945 deaths
Members of the Free Association of German Trade Unions
Members of the Free Workers' Union of Germany
People from the Province of Saxony
Anarcho-syndicalists
Farmworkers
German civilians killed in World War II
Deaths by explosive device